The Laughter of Fools is a 1933 British drama film directed by Adrian Brunel and starring D. A. Clarke-Smith, Derrick De Marney and Helen Ferrers. It was based on a play by H. F. Maltby. The screenplay concerns an ambitious mother who plans to marry her daughter to a sea captain.

The film was a quota quickie made at Nettlefold Studios in Walton by the independent producer George Smith as part of a contract from Fox who needed a supply of films to distribute in order to comply with the terms of the quota.

Cast
 D. A. Clarke-Smith as Plunket 
 Derrick De Marney as Captain Vidal 
 Helen Ferrers as Mrs. Gregg 
 Eliot Makeham as John Gregg 
 Granville Ferrier as Hughes Sr. 
 Pat Paterson as Doris Gregg 
 Minnie Taylor as Elizabeth 
 George Thirlwell as Bertie Gregg 
 Dorothy Vernon as Cook 
 Fred Withers as Nuttall

Bibliography
 Chibnall, Steve. Quota Quickies: The Birth of the British 'B' film. British Film Institute, 2007.
 Low, Rachael. History of the British Film: Filmmaking in 1930s Britain. George Allen & Unwin, 1985.

External links

1933 films
1933 drama films
British drama films
Films shot at Nettlefold Studios
Films directed by Adrian Brunel
British films based on plays
Films set in England
British black-and-white films
1930s English-language films
1930s British films
Quota quickies